Joshua Marie Wilkinson (born December 2, 1977) is an American poet, editor, publisher, and filmmaker.

Life
He was born on December 2, 1977, and raised in Haller Lake neighborhood, Seattle, Washington. His given name is Joshua Wilson; his grandmother's name was Marie Wilkinson, after whom he writes and publishes. He earned degrees in Poetry (M.F.A., University of Arizona), Film (M.A., University College Dublin), and English (PhD, University of Denver).  He has also edited five anthologies and directed a tour documentary of the band Califone with Solan Jensen released in 2011 by IndiePix.

His work appeared at PEN Poetry Series, Academy of American Poets, the Poetry Society of America, Boston Review,  and Bomb. His writing has also been featured in many anthologies including both Postmodern American Poetry edited by Paul Hoover and Language Lessons: Vol. 1 from Jack White's Third Man Records, which was featured in Rolling Stone, Spin, The Guardian, and elsewhere.

He currently teaches creative writing at University of Arizona  and is a founding editor of the online literary journal of poetry and poetics The Volta. and a founding editor of the small press Letter Machine Editions, which has been honored by the National Book Award Foundation.

He is married to the writer Lisa Wells.

Selected works

Books

The Courier's Archive & Hymnal, Sidebrow Books, 2013,   
Swamp Isthmus, Black Ocean, 2013,  
Selenography, with Polaroids by Tim Rutili, Sidebrow Books, 2010, 
The Book of Whispering in the Projection Booth, Tupelo Press, 2009,  
Figures for a Darkroom Voice, (with Noah Eli Gordon) Tarpaulin Sky Press, 2007,  
Lug Your Careless Body Out of the Careful Dusk: A Poem in Fragments,  University of Iowa Press, 2006, 
Suspension of a Secret in Abandoned Rooms,  Pinball Publishing, 2005,

Anthologies
Anne Carson: Ecstatic Lyre, University of Michigan Press, 2015,   
The Volta Book of Poets, Sidebrow Books, 2015,   
The Force of What's Possible: Writers on Accessibility & the Avant-Garde, with Lily Hoang, Nightboat Books, 2015,  
Poets on Teaching: A Sourcebook, University of Iowa Press, 2010,  
12x12: Conversations in 21st-Century Poetry and Poetics, with Christina Mengert, University of Iowa Press, 2009,

Chapbooks
A Little Slash at the Meadow, Above/Ground Press, 2013
In the Trade of Alive Letters Mis-sent, Brave Men Press, 2011
I go by Edgar Huntly now, DoubleCross Press, 2009
Until the Lantern's Shaky Song: poems for my friends, Cinematheque Press, 2009
Cold Faction, Further Adventures Press, 2009
The Book of Flashlights, Clover, & Milk (Pilot Books, 2008)
The Book of Truants & Projectorlight (Octopus Books, 2006)
A Ghost as King of the Rabbits (New Michigan Press, 2005)

Films
Made a Machine by Describing the Landscape: a film about Califone, co-directed by Solan Jensen (IndiePix Films, 2011)

References

External links
BOMB Magazine Interview: Part I (by Peter Moysaenko)
BOMB Magazine Interview: Part II (by Peter Moysaenko)
http://eyelashfire.blogspot.com/
http://www.poets.org/viewmedia.php/prmMID/19090
rabbit light movies, online journal of poemfilms; the journal was created by Joshua Marie Wilkinson
an interview
A SAINT AMONG THE STRAGGLERS’ BEDS (PART 2), a poem in Octopus Magazine #11
an interview with Abraham Smith by Joshua Marie Wilkinson

American male poets
Living people
University of Arizona alumni
University of Denver alumni
Filmmakers from Seattle
Chapbook writers
1977 births
21st-century American poets
21st-century American male writers